Stanley Thomas Ilsley (born 18 June 1938) is an English former first-class cricketer.

Ilsley was associated with Middlesex, appearing for their second eleven with some success between 1955 and 1958 as a slow left-arm orthodox bowler, but was unable to force his way into the Middlesex first eleven. While engaged with Middlesex at Lord's, he did feature in two first-class cricket matches for the Marylebone Cricket Club in 1956, playing against Cambridge University and Oxford University. He took 5 wickets across these two matches, with best figures of 3 for 39.

References

External links

1938 births
Living people
People from Marylebone
English cricketers
Marylebone Cricket Club cricketers